Michelle A. Henry (born ) is an American prosecutor who is the current Pennsylvania Attorney General since 2023. She was previously the first deputy attorney general, the first woman to serve in the role. Henry served as the district attorney of Bucks County in 2008.

Early life 
Henry was born . She is from Greensburg, Pennsylvania and graduated from Greensburg Salem High School. She completed a bachelor's degree in communication arts with a focus in public speaking at Allegheny College in 1991. Henry earned a Juris Doctor degree from the Widener University Commonwealth Law School in 1994. She started her legal career as an intern in the Westmoreland County District Attorney's Office. She clerked for a Lancaster County judge for a year.

Career 
Henry was a prosecutor in the Bucks County District Attorney's office for 21 years. She was a Republican. In 1998, she became head of the child abuse prosecution. In January 2008, she was appointed as the county's district attorney. Henry did not run for election in 2009, instead prosecuting cases as the county's second highest ranking attorney. In December 2016, she was selected by Pennsylvania Attorney General-elect Josh Shapiro as the first deputy attorney general. Beginning in January 2017, she is the first woman to serve in the role. 

In January 2023, Henry was selected by now-Governor Shapiro to serve out the final two years of his term as the attorney general. She has expressed that she does not view herself as a politician and does not intend to run for election at the end of the term. The Pennsylvania State Senate voted to confirm Henry's appointment on March 8, 2023.

Personal life 
In 2008, Henry resided in Doylestown Township, Pennsylvania. She lived in the suburbs of Philadelphia for 20 years and as of 2023, resides in Harrisburg, Pennsylvania.

See also 

 List of female state attorneys general in the United States

References 

 

1960s births
21st-century American women lawyers
21st-century American lawyers
Allegheny College alumni
County district attorneys in Pennsylvania
Living people
Pennsylvania Attorneys General
Pennsylvania Democrats
Pennsylvania Republicans
People from Doylestown, Pennsylvania
People from Greensburg, Pennsylvania
People from Harrisburg, Pennsylvania
Place of birth missing (living people)
Widener University Commonwealth Law School alumni
Year of birth missing (living people)